Alarie is a French surname.  Notable people with this name include:

Bella Alarie (born 1998), American basketball player; daughter of Mark Alarie
Benjamin Alarie (born 1977), law professor and entrepreneur
Donald Alarie (born 1945), Canadian writer
Elissa Alarie (born 1986), Canadian rugby player
Hélène Alarie (born 1941), Canadian politician
Mark Alarie (born 1963), American basketball player
Pierre Alarie, Canadian ambassador
Pierrette Alarie (1921–2011), Canadian opera singer

French-language surnames